Ondřej Kozlovský (born August 15, 1982) is a Czech bobsledder who has competed since 2007. He finished 16th in the four-man event at the 2010 Winter Olympics in Vancouver. Kozlovský's best World Cup finish was 19th in the four-man event at Altenberg, Germany in December 2009.

References

Biography of Ondřej Kozlovský 

1982 births
Bobsledders at the 2010 Winter Olympics
Czech male bobsledders
Living people
Olympic bobsledders of the Czech Republic